Antonen is a Finnish surname. Notable people with the surname include:

Joose Antonen (born 1995), Finnish ice hockey player
Juuso Antonen (born 1988), Finnish ice hockey player

See also

Antonin (name)
Antenen
Antone
Antonee

Finnish-language surnames